Olof Palme Street (romanised: úlitsa Úlofa Pál'me) is a street in Ramenki District, Western Administrative Okrug, Moscow. The street was named after Olof Palme, the assassinated Prime Minister of Sweden.

Layout

Effectively, Ulofa Pal'me Street is an extension of Universitetsky Prospekt, the latter ending at a crossroads with Mosfilmovskaya Street. Ulofa Pal'me Street runs further north-west downhill towards Setun River and turns to the right after crossing Dovzhenko Street.

Notable buildings

 4 - Embassy of the United Arab Emirates
 6 - Embassy of Angola

The embassy of Sweden is located at the crossing of Mosfilmovskaya Street and Ulofa Pal'me Street, the actual address being 60 Mosfilmovskaya Street.

Image gallery

Olof Palme
Streets in Moscow